James Hickman (born 2 February 1976) is a male English former competitive swimmer.

Swimming career
Hickman represented Great Britain in the Olympics, FINA world championships and European championships, and England in the Commonwealth Games.  He became a world champion five times on the 200 m butterfly in short course (25 m), twice world record holder, Commonwealth Champion and four times European Champion. He announced his retirement from the sport in 2004. During that year he reached the semi-final of the 100 m butterfly in the 2004 Athens Olympics, finishing with a time of 53.10 seconds. He also reached the semi-final in the 2000 Sydney Olympics finishing 6th (likewise in the 200 m butterfly). His best appearance in an Olympic final came in the 1996 Atlanta Games, where he placed 7th in the 200 m butterfly.

At the ASA National British Championships he won the 100 metres butterfly title five times in 1998, 1999, 2000, 2001 and 2002  and the 200 metres butterfly title three times in 1994, 1998 and 1999.

Personal life
Hickman also owns a television and radio production company called Made in Manchester Productions. He set it up with Ashley Byrne (BBC broadcaster and former commercial radio boss) in May 2005. The company made From Bomb to Boom (about the Manchester bomb) for ITV1, Cartoon Kings presented by Sir David Jason (about animators Cosgrove and Hall) for ITV1 and Another Fine Mess for BBC Radio 2, presented by Sir Norman Wisdom (celebrating 80 years of Laurel and Hardy). Made in Manchester has also been commissioned to make a religious documentary for BBC Radio 4 which was broadcast in early 2007. They have also produced radio shows for BBC Radio Manchester in the Citizen Manchester Series, plus various other documentaries for the station. They have also produced "Jah Wobble's Mystical Musical Tour" for the BBC World Service, "Salt 'n' Pepa – Push it" for BBC Radio 1Xtra and also "Brass Britain" and a documentary about the Beach Boys for BBC Radio 2.

In 2008 Made in Manchester won the contract to deliver the PR and Communications for the FINA World Swimming Championships 2008 in the MEN Arena for which James was the Head of PR and Communications. The event was the first of its kind in a concert venue and won "Best Event Look" at the SportBusiness Awards 2008.

He currently works for Speedo International as the Global Sports Marketing Manager and manages the international sponsorships for the brand. He worked on London 2012 Olympics, 2013 FINA World Championships and 2014 Glasgow Commonwealth Games.

Hickman attended William Hulme's Grammar School and the Victoria University of Manchester.

Achievements
Short Course World 200 m butterfly champion in 1997, 1999, 2000, 2002 and 2004
Commonwealth 200 m butterfly champion – 1998
Short Course World record holder, 100 and 200 butterfly (short course) from 1998 to 2001
European 200 m butterfly champion in 1999 and 2001
Great Britain Olympic team member in 1996, 2000 and 2004

See also
 List of Commonwealth Games medallists in swimming (men)
 World record progression 100 metres butterfly
 World record progression 200 metres butterfly

References

External links
James Hickman's official website

1976 births
Living people
English male swimmers
Male butterfly swimmers
Swimmers at the 1996 Summer Olympics
Swimmers at the 2000 Summer Olympics
Swimmers at the 2004 Summer Olympics
Olympic swimmers of Great Britain
Sportspeople from Stockport
World record setters in swimming
Commonwealth Games gold medallists for England
Commonwealth Games silver medallists for England
Commonwealth Games bronze medallists for England
People educated at William Hulme's Grammar School
Medalists at the FINA World Swimming Championships (25 m)
European Aquatics Championships medalists in swimming
Commonwealth Games medallists in swimming
Swimmers at the 1994 Commonwealth Games
Swimmers at the 1998 Commonwealth Games
Swimmers at the 2002 Commonwealth Games
Medallists at the 1994 Commonwealth Games
Medallists at the 1998 Commonwealth Games
Medallists at the 2002 Commonwealth Games